"Hi-Five" is the fifth single by Japanese rock act Superfly, and was the last single released prior to the band's debut self-titled album. The main track was used in promotions for au's "LISMO" service in April 2008. The B-sides for the physical release of the album were three of the four tracks from their 2007 iTunes Store set released as Live from Tokyo. "Hi-Five" ultimately reached the number 30 spot on the Oricon charts, while it went to number 7 on the Japan Hot 100.

Track listing

References

External links
"Hi-Five" on Superfly's official website

2008 singles
2008 songs
Japanese-language songs
Songs used as jingles
Superfly (band) songs
Warner Music Japan singles